Robert Burnham (or Bernham) (died 10 August 1362) was a Canon of Windsor from 1351 to 1362

Career

He was appointed:
Rector of Middleton Cheney, Northamptonshire 1353

He was appointed to the seventh stall in St George's Chapel, Windsor Castle in 1351 and held the canonry until 1362.

Notes 

1362 deaths
Canons of Windsor
Year of birth unknown